John Loredo (born September 27, 1967) is a former member of the Arizona House of Representatives from January 1997 until January 2005. Prior to running for the Arizona House, he ran unsuccessfully for the Phoenix City Council in 1992.  In 1994 he worked on the unsuccessful campaign for governor of Eddie Basha Jr. He was first elected to the House in November 1996, representing District 22, and was re-elected to that same district in 1998 and 2000. After redistricting in 2002, he ran unopposed for re-election in District 13, along with fellow Democrat Steve Gallardo.

References

Hispanic and Latino American state legislators in Arizona
Democratic Party members of the Arizona House of Representatives
1967 births
Living people